The localities and neighborhoods of Hyderabad have unique oral histories, dating to the time of the Qutb Shahi dynasty, over 400 years ago, and are named after various people and things. Some are named after a major building or structure in the locality, (Falaknuma, Koti, Lal Darwaza) others named for individuals. The names are mostly in Telugu and Urdu, the major languages of the city. This is a list of localities, neighborhoods and streets of Hyderabad and their etymology.

 A. C. Guards - stands for African Cavalry Guards; named after the African personal bodyguards of the Nizam; it is the area where they used to reside.
A. S. Rao Nagar - named after Ayyagari Sambasiva Rao, the founder of the nearby ECIL.
Abids - named after Jewish merchant, Albert Abid.
 Afzal Gunj - named after the fifth Nizam, Afzal ad-Dawlah. Gunj means mart or market.
Aghapura - named after Hazrat Dawood.
 Banjara Hills - named by Mehdi Nawaz Jung after the Banjara community, its original residents.
 Barkas - a corrupted form of Barracks; the area housed the military barracks of the Nizam
 Bashirbagh - literally "Bashir's garden" in Urdu; named after Nawab Bashir-ud-Doula, where his palace used to stand.
Begum Bazar - named after Humda Begum, wife of the second Nizam; It is believed she gave the land to the merchants of the city.
Begumpet - Named after Bahshir-ul-Nisa Begum, daughter of Sikandar Jah.
Chaderghat - "Chader" literally means "White Sheet" in Urdu.
Chettha Bazar - is a place at Purani Haveli. It is a corrupted form of Chath bazaar. Chath is a hindi/urdu word means Shade, which is used to provide shade to the bazaar marchants.
 Dar-ul-Shifa - literally "House of Healing" in Urdu; named after a historic hospital in the area.
Dabirpura - literally "Colony of Scholars". Named in the honour of Dabir-ul-Mulk.
 Falaknuma - literally "Mirror of the Sky" in Urdu; named after the Falaknuma Palace.
 Hayathnagar - named after Hayath Bakshi Begum, daughter of Muhammad Quli Qutb Shah; this is the area where she built a mosque.
 Himayatnagar - named after the son of the last Nizam, Prince Azam Jah, or Mir Himayat Ali Khan.
HITEC City - an abbreviated form of Hyderabad Information Technology and Engineering Consultancy City.
Hyderguda - named after Hyder Ali, a collector who acquired the property from Waheedunnissa Begum, sister of Sikandar Jah, the sixth Nizam of Hyderabad.
 Khairtabad - named after Khairunnisa Begum, daughter of Sultan Muhammad Qutb Shah; this is the area where she built a mosque.
 Koranti - a place where * Sir Ronald Ross Institute of Tropical and Communicable Diseases, also known as * Fever Hospital is situated. Its a crude form of "Quarantine" eventually became Koranti.
 Koti - literally "mansion" in Urdu; named after the Koti Residency, which used to be located here. 
 Lal Darwaza - literally "Red Door" in Urdu; named after a Red Gateway that used to exist in the area.
Lallaguda - Lalla, the architect of the palace of Bibi Saheba, the queen of Nizam Ali Khan, Asaf Jah II 
 Mahatma Gandhi Road - named after Mahatma Gandhi after independence; previously used to be called James Street, named after Major James Achilles Kirkpatrick.
Malakpet - named after Malik Yaqoub, a servant of Abdullah Qutb Shah, where he used to reside.
Malkajgiri - said to be the corruption of Mallikarjuna Giri, named after Lord Mallikarjuna.
Masab Tank - a corruption of Ma Saheba Tank, after a tank which itself was named after Hayath Bakshi Begum (called Ma Saheba affectionately), a Qutb Shahi princess.
 Mehdipatnam - named after Mehdi Nawaz Jung, a politician, bureaucrat and eminent personality of Hyderabad.
 Moazzam Jahi Market - named after the son of the last Nizam, Prince Moazzam Jah.
 Moosrambagh - also Moosa Ram Bagh is an old suburb of Hyderabad, Telangana, India. It is named after the French military commander Monsieur Raymond who served the Nizams during the 18th century. His tomb Raymond's Tomb is located near Asman Garh Palace. The locality of "Moosa-Ram-Bagh" is named after him. Wherein, Bagh refers to "a Garden" as the area was once covered by huge greenery.
 Moula Ali - named after the Moula Ali Dargah (a dargah, or shrine dedicated to Ali), which is located here.
 Musheerabad - named after Nawab Arastu Jah Mushir-ul-Mulk, who served as Prime Minister of Hyderabad.
 Nampally - named after Nekh Nam Khan, a Diwan of Hyderabad during the Qutb Shahi era.
 Nayapul - literally "New Bridge" in Urdu; named for a bridge built over the River Musi located here.
 Puranapul - literally "Old Bridge" in Urdu; named for the 400-year-old bridge over River Musi located here.
P.V. Narasimha Rao Expressway, named after P. V. Narasimha Rao, a former Prime Minister of India
 Sanjeeva Reddy Nagar - named after Neelam Sanjiva Reddy, former President of India.
 Saroornagar - named after Suroor Afza Bai, wife of Arastu Jah, the then Prime Minister of Hyderabad.
 Secunderabad - named after the third Nizam, Sikandar Jah.
Somajiguda - named after Sonaji, an employee of the revenue department of Roy Ryan Sham Raj.
Tadbun palm valley - Tadban (Palm Valley) got its name from the erstwhile presence of palm trees in the area and across the banks of Mir Alam Lake.

References 

Hyderabad, India-related lists
Lists of place name etymologies